Elijah Behnke (born February 15, 1983) is an American small business owner and Republican politician.  He is a member of the Wisconsin State Assembly, having won an April 2021 special election in the 89th Assembly district.

Biography
Behnke was born in Oconto Falls, Wisconsin, and raised on his parents' nearby farm.  He worked on the farm through his childhood and graduated from Oconto High School in 2001.  He went on to attend bible college in northeast Georgia.

In 2006, he returned to Wisconsin and started working for his mother's cleaning business.  After a year, he started his own cleaning business, Eschalon Cleaning LLC.  In addition to his cleaning business, Behnke operates a hobby farm and is a ministry leader in his church.

In December 2020, just after the 2020 election, state representative John Nygren announced he would resign from office.  Within days, Behnke announced his candidacy for the Republican nomination to succeed Nygren in the Assembly.  In his campaign, Behnke stated that one of his motivations in running for office was to seek relief for small business owners like himself who had been harmed by the COVID-19 pandemic and the resultant public safety measures.  In the Republican primary, Behnke was endorsed by neighboring State Senator André Jacque and Oconto County Sheriff Todd Skarban, as well as other state Republican interest groups, such as Wisconsin Family Action, Pro Life Wisconsin, and Wisconsin Right to Life.  Behnke topped the five-person Republican primary field with nearly 45% of the vote.  He went on to defeat Democrat Karl Jaeger in the April special election.

A recording of Behnke speaking in the Wisconsin State Capitol emerged in January 2022. Behnke referred to fabricated claims of Democrat electoral fraud, and urged his listeners: "Let's cheat like the Democrats do."

On Wednesday, June 22, 2022, Governor Evers’ called for a Special Session to defend reproductive rights in Wisconsin to introduce and pass AB 713 and AB 106, which would have protected the right for women to have a say over their bodies. Despite bipartisan support for legal access to abortion from both Wisconsin Democrats and Republicans, Elijah Behnke and other Republicans in the Legislature gaveled in and gaveled out at the special session without protecting women's rights and leaving 1.3 million Wisconsin women of reproductive age without access to a legal abortion.

Electoral history

Wisconsin Assembly (2021)

| colspan="6" style="text-align:center;background-color: #e9e9e9;"| Republican Primary, February 16, 2021

| colspan="6" style="text-align:center;background-color: #e9e9e9;"| General Election, April 6, 2021 (unofficial results)

References

External links
 
 
 Campaign website (Archived April 7, 2021)

1983 births
Living people
People from Oconto County, Wisconsin
21st-century American politicians
Republican Party members of the Wisconsin State Assembly